Oduom is a small town in the Kumasi Metropolitan, a district of the Ashanti Region of Ghana.

Geography

Location
Oduom is 15 kilometres from the centre of Kumasi. Oduom is a dormitory town. It serves mainly as a residential areas for workers in various companies in Kumasi.

Boundaries
The town is bordered on the south by Fumesua, to the West by Domeabra, to the east by Boadi and to the North by Kentinkrono.

Notable places
KNUST has part of its teak farm in the town.

References

Populated places in Kumasi Metropolitan Assembly
Populated places in the Ashanti Region